Ophthalmoglipa aurocaudata is a species of beetle in the genus Ophthalmoglipa of the family Mordellidae. It was described in 1897.

References

Beetles described in 1897
Mordellidae